Super Ranger Kids is a 1997 Filipino superhero film directed by Rogelio Salvador. Released in 1997, the film is a pastiche of the American television series Mighty Morphin Power Rangers, the first Power Rangers series, and, by extension, the Japanese Super Sentai series Kyōryū Sentai Zyuranger, which formed the basis for Mighty Morphin.

Programmes from the two franchises had been broadcast, dubbed into Filipino or Tagalog, along with various other tokusatsu programmes, in the Philippines since the late 70s. The various series were popular enough to spawn imitators and pastiches, including Super Ranger Kids. The key difference between Kids and its inspiration is that the primary hero characters are ten to twelve years old as opposed to teenagers or young adults. However, the influence from Power Rangers is obvious even in the logo, with the use of a similar font and the distinctive "lightning bolt" design.

Cast 

 Rodney Shattara as Zacky / Super Ranger Red Lion
 Joseph Reyes as Tom / Super Ranger Green Dragon
 Paul Burns as Willy / Super Ranger Blue Eagle
 Sarah Polvireni as Tiny / Super Ranger Yellow Tiger
 Thea 'Rose' Tupaz as Kim / Super Ranger Pink Panther
 Ara Mina as Diabolika
 Ruel Vernal as Satano
 Allan Paule as Mikaelo
 Orestes Ojeda as Roy
 Liza Ranillo as Jean
 Cloyd Robinson as Father Eric
 Willy Romero as Gorgon

References

Super Ranger Kids at "International Hero"

1997 films
Philippine martial arts comedy films
Tagalog-language films
1997 martial arts films